The Girl I Loved is a 1923 American drama silent film directed by Joe De Grasse and written by Albert Ray. The film stars Charles Ray, Patsy Ruth Miller, Ramsey Wallace, Edythe Chapman and William Courtright. The film was released on February 15, 1923, by United Artists.

Cast 
Charles Ray as John Middleton 
Patsy Ruth Miller as Mary
Ramsey Wallace as Willie Brown
Edythe Chapman as Mother Middleton
William Courtright as Neighbor Silas Gregg
Charlotte Woods as Betty Short
Gus Leonard as Neighbor Perkins
F.B. Phillips as Hired Man
Lon Poff as Minister 
Jess Herring as Hiram Lang
Ruth Bolgiano as Ruth Lang
Edward Moncrief as The Judge
George F. Marion as The Judge
Billie Latimer as A Spinster

Preservation 
The film survives in complete at the property of Cinematheque Royale de Belgique and Gosfilmofond.

References

External links 
 

1923 films
American silent feature films
American black-and-white films
1920s English-language films
United Artists films
Films directed by Joseph De Grasse
Silent American drama films
1923 drama films
1920s American films